Leo Joseph Healy (20 October 1890 – 19 January 1939) was an Australian rules footballer who played with Geelong in the Victorian Football League (VFL).

Notes

External links 

1890 births
1939 deaths
Australian rules footballers from Geelong
Geelong Football Club players